T-111 was a minesweeper of the Soviet Navy during World War II and the Cold War. Upon completion she was transferred to the Soviet Union under Lend-Lease as T-111; she was never returned to the United States. The Soviets later scuttled the ship in the Barents Sea in 1956. Because of the Cold War, the U.S. Navy was unaware of this fate and the vessel remained on the American Naval Vessel Register until she was struck on 1 January 1983.

Career 
Advocate was laid down on 8 April 1942 at Tampa, Florida, by the Tampa Shipbuilding Co.; launched on 1 November 1942; sponsored by Mrs. A. K. Brown; and completed on 25 June 1943. She was transferred to the Soviet Navy that same day as T-111. She was never returned to U.S. custody.

T-111 was scuttled by the Soviet Navy in the Barents Sea in 1956.

Due to the ongoing Cold War, the U.S. Navy was unaware of this fate. They had reclassified the vessel as MSF-138 on 7 February 1955, and kept her on the American Naval Vessel Register until she was struck on 1 January 1983.

References 

Admirable-class minesweepers
Ships built in Tampa, Florida
1942 ships
World War II minesweepers of the United States
Admirable-class minesweepers of the Soviet Navy
World War II minesweepers of the Soviet Union
Cold War minesweepers of the Soviet Union
Shipwrecks in the Barents Sea